Azadegan Rural District is a rural district (dehestan) in the Central District of Galugah County, Mazandaran Province, Iran. At the 2006 census, its population was 3,044, in 814 families. The rural district has 3 villages.

References 

Rural Districts of Mazandaran Province
Galugah County